The 2008 Davis Cup was the 97th edition of the most important tournament between national teams in men's tennis. Sixteen teams participated in the World Group and more than one hundred others took part in different regional groups. The first matches were played on February 8–10. The final took place on November 21–23 at Estadio Polideportivo Islas Malvinas, Mar del Plata, Argentina, with Spain beating Argentina 3–1 to clinch their 3rd Davis Cup title.

World Group

Draw

Final

World Group play-offs

 Date: 19–21 September
The eight losing teams in the World Group first round ties, and eight winners of the Group I second round ties entered the draw for the World Group play-offs. Eight seeded teams, based on the Davis Cup rankings as of 14 April, were drawn against eight unseeded teams.

Americas Zone

Group I
Participating Teams

  – advanced to World Group play-offs
 
  – advanced to World Group play-offs
 
  – relegated to Group II in 2009

Group II
Participating Teams

  
  – relegated to Group III in 2009 
 
  – promoted to Group I in 2009
  – relegated to Group III in 2009

Group III
Participating Teams

   – relegated to Group IV in 2009
 
   – promoted to Group II in 2009
 
   – promoted to Group II in 2009
   – relegated to Group IV in 2009
 
Withdrawn: Cuba

Group IV
Participating Teams

 
  – promoted to Group III in 2009
  – promoted to Group III in 2009
 
 Withdrawn: Trinidad and Tobago

Asia/Oceania Zone

Group I
Participating Teams
  – advanced to World Group play-offs
 
  – advanced to World Group play-offs
  
 
  – relegated to Group II in 2009

Group II
Participating Teams

  – promoted to Group I in 2009
 
 
 
  – relegated to Group III in 2009
 
 
  Pacific Oceania – relegated to Group III in 2009

Group III
Participating Teams

 
  – promoted to Group II in 2009
  – promoted to Group II in 2009
 
 
 
  – relegated to Group IV in 2009
  – relegated to Group IV in 2009

Group IV
Participating Teams

 
 
 
 
 
 
 
 
  – promoted to Group III in 2009
  – promoted to Group III in 2009

Europe/Africa Zone

Group I
Participating Teams

 – advanced to World Group play-offs
 – relegated to Group II in 2009

 – relegated to Group II in 2009

 – advanced to World Group play-offs

 – advanced to World Group play-offs
 – advanced to World Group play-offs

Group II
Participating Teams

 – relegated to Group III in 2009

 – relegated to Group III in 2009

 – relegated to Group III in 2009

 – promoted to Group I in 2009
 – relegated to Group III in 2009
 – promoted to Group I in 2009

Group III

Venue 1
Participating Teams
  – promoted to Group II in 2009
  – relegated to Group IV in 2009
 
  – promoted to Group II in 2009
 
  – relegated to Group IV in 2009
 Withdrawn: Botswana and Nigeria

Venue 2
Participating Teams
 
  – relegated to Group IV in 2009
 
 
  – relegated to Group IV in 2009
  – promoted to Group II in 2009
  – promoted to Group II in 2009

Group IV
Participating Teams
  – promoted to Group III in 2009
  – promoted to Group III in 2009
  – promoted to Group III in 2009
  – promoted to Group III in 2009
 Withdrawn: Libya, Malta, and Mauritius

See also

 2008 Fed Cup – Women's
 2008 Hopman Cup

References

External links 

Davis Cup draw details

 
Davis Cup
Davis Cups by year